Gerrie may refer to:

 Gerrie (given name), a unisex given name
 Syd Gerrie (born 1927), Scottish footballer

See also

 Garrie (disambiguation)
 Gerri (disambiguation)
 Gerry (disambiguation)
 Jerrie